Piz Scharboda is a mountain of the Swiss Lepontine Alps, overlooking the lake of Zervreila in the canton of Graubünden. It lies south of Piz Terri, near the border with the canton of Ticino.

References

External links
 Piz Scharboda on Hikr

Mountains of the Alps
Alpine three-thousanders
Mountains of Switzerland
Mountains of Graubünden
Lepontine Alps
Vals, Switzerland